Dighwara is a town and a Nagar Panchayat in the Saran district, state of Bihar, India. The name probably derives from 'Dirgh-dwar', literally "large gate", as Dighwara is claimed to be the entrance to the mythological city of king Daksha.  During British Rule it was a Feudal Estate ruled by the Raghuvanshis.The town lies on the banks of Ganges River. A road bridge has been planned to be constructed over Ganges, between Dighwara and Danapur.

History 
The archaeological records suggests that Dighwara in Saran had supplied copper plate issued in the reign of king Mahendrapala in 898 A.D.

Geography 
It has an average elevation of 43 metres (141 feet).

The State Government in collaboration with Power Grid Corporation of India founded the Sitalpur Power Grid in the year 2000 to provide electricity to the Rail Wheel Plant, Bela in Dariapur block and neighbouring villages in a radius of 25km.

Demographics 
, the Government of Bihar decided to develop Dighwara as a city of Patna Mahanagar.

Villages under the jurisdiction of Dighwara are:
 
 Aami
 Akilpur diyara
 Barbanna
 Basatpur
 Basti jalal
 Bodha Chapra
 Sitalpur
 Chaknoor
 Farhada
 Gorainpur
 Haraji
 Hematpur
 Kuraiya
 Laxmipur kakadhian
 Malkhachak
 Manupur
 Mirpur Bhual
 Pipra
 Raipatti
 Ramdaschak
 Rampur Pratappur
 Saidpur
 Trilokchak
Bagheen

Languages spoken in Dighwara 
The major languages of the town are: Hindi, Bhojpuri and English. Although for cultural practices Sanskrit is used.

Education 

 Girls High School Shankarpur Road
 Jai Govind High School, Dighwara
 Middle School, Dighwara
 K N T College, Bhairopur
 Y N College, Dighwara
 Sri Baldev Vidyalaya, Trilokchak.
Shyam Sundar Phula Devi Mahila college Dighwara
 Ram Jangal Singh College Dighwara
 S p Academy Dighwara 
 Kendriya Vidyalaya -Dariyapur
 S.S.Academy - Ami.
 Central Public School Pukar Complex
 Holy Trinity Mission School, Bus Stand Dighwara
 S.C.I. Institute, Shankarpur Road, Dighwara
 Life Line Academy, Bus stand, Dighwara

Hospitals of Dighwara 
 Shrinivas Hospital, Dighwara
 Rajkiya Hospital, Dighwara

Temples

Budhiya Mai Mandir or Temple of Budhiya Mai, Haraji
Budhiya Mai Mandir is one of the oldest temples in Dighwara block. It is situated at Haraji Bazaar. Its nearest railway station is Awatar Nagar Railway Station. It is located 100 meter away from NH 19, Haraji.

Thakur Jee Maharaj Temple or Thakurbadi, Haraji
Thakurbadi is the oldest temple in Panchayat Bhavan Road, Harajee. In this temple, there are many statues of the Hindu religion's Gods like Thakur Jee, Shiv Jee, and Ganesh Jee. It is situated in Panchayat Bhawan Road, Haraji.

Nakati Devi Mandir or Temple of Nakati Devi, Dighwara
This is actually the temple of Durga. A statue of Mahishasur mardini is installs in the temple. The statue is probably made of the historical Pall period.

Temple of Maa Ambika, (Aami)
It is an old fort like building on the banks of the Ganges River. The temple is an example of standard north Indian temple architecture and has a central shrine or garvagriha housing the main idol of goddess Ambika. There is a yagya kunda where religious acts are carried out. A large idol of Shiva has been erected recently near the yagya kunda. Ambika Ashthan is mentioned in the ancient Hindu Markandeya Purana. The story of Maa Durga Sapt Sati supposedly took place in Aami, Dighwara. It is the place where Durga materialised to present gifts to Raja Surath. The claim is under investigation by many authors and experts in Indian archaeology.

References

Cities and towns in Saran district